Neumann International, headquartered in Vienna, Austria, is a European human resource consulting and executive search firm, with offices throughout Europe and in China.

The company, which is a member of the New York-based Association of Executive Search and Leadership Consultants (AESC) provides services such as executive search, executive consulting and compensation consulting.

Neumann International's CEO, Serge Lamielle, is the Chairman of the AESC Europe and vice-chair of the Global Board of the AESC.

In the spring of 1989, just a few months before the fall of the Iron Curtain, the company opened its branch in Budapest, Hungary, being the first Western-European Executive Search having a fully owned representation in the Eastern Bloc. In 2011, the company, having to cover $12 million worth of unsecured investments, began a reorganization effort to solve its insolvency.

References

External links

Executive search firms
Service companies of Austria